Bela is a small settlement in the Municipality of Kamnik in the Upper Carniola region of Slovenia. It includes the hamlets of Sveti Miklavž Bela, Mala Ravan, Nadlisnik, Reber (in older sources also Rebro), Slopi, and Vodlan.

Name
Bela was attested as Uelach in 1229 and Velach in 1243, among other spellings. Locally, the settlement is also known as Špitalska Bela (i.e., Bela near Špitalič).

Church
The local church above the settlement is dedicated to Saint Nicholas and is an example of a village chapel of ease with a star-vaulted sanctuary, dating to the 15th century.

References

External links 

Bela on Geopedia

Populated places in the Municipality of Kamnik